Vasily Ivanovich Piskaryov is a deputy for the United Russia party in the 7th State Duma of the Russian Federation. He is the head of the committee on Safety and Anti-Corruption.

On February 28, 2022, during Russia's invasion of Ukraine, Pisharyov introduced a bill in his committee that would criminalize the distribution of "fake" news or information about the war, with punishments of up to 15 years in prison. Determination of whether the information was "fake" is left to the Russian government. The bill was widely criticized as a ploy to silence independent journalism in the country. The bill passed the Duma and was signed into law on March 4 by Russian President Vladimir Putin, prompting dozens of news organizations, both in and out of Russia, to stop publishing news about the war.

See also 
Russian 2022 war censorship laws
Censorship in the Russian Federation

References 

21st-century Russian politicians
Living people
1963 births
United Russia politicians
People from Kursk Oblast
Seventh convocation members of the State Duma (Russian Federation)
Eighth convocation members of the State Duma (Russian Federation)
Ural State Law University alumni